Dry Hot Summers (transliterated: Har gaf sayfan) is a 2015 Egyptian short film directed by Sherif El Bendary. It was an official selection at Clermont-Ferrand International Short Film Festival.

Plot summary
One summer day in Cairo creates an unexpected encounter between two strangers on opposite chapters of their lives. Shawky is a silent old man struggling with cancer, who only has a few weeks left. Doaa is an energetic young woman who grabs her last chance to marry and start a new life in another city, building up a family, she herself so desperately misses. Both are isolated from society in different ways. Since his son is too busy to accompany him, Shawky is alone on his way to see a tumor specialist, a French physician, who is in Cairo for just a few days and means his last hope. Shawky's yellow plastic bag containing all his x-rays and medical tests are accidentally taken by the young woman (Doaa) he shares a taxi with. Doaa is getting ready for her wedding party later that night, but as she lives all alone in the city, only her motherly neighbor helps her with the busy preparations. As Doaa rushes through the city, the bridal bouquet gets lost and is picked up by Shawky, who is following her in search of his yellow plastic bag. The lost x-rays and the lost flowers oblige them to spend a fraught and exhausting day together, a journey through the city that plants the seed of hope where they never expected it. Before he catches his appointment with the doctor and she finally arrives at her wedding party, the two isolated people reconnect against all odds and form a human bond as they realize the preciousness of this very moment in their lives.

Cast
 Mohamed Farid .. Shawky
 Nahed El Sebai .. Dooa

Awards and nominations
 Official selection, Clermont-Ferrand International Short Film Festival
 Best Short Film (shared), Malmö Arab Film Festival
 Best Director, Bangalore International Short Film Festival
 Best Short Film, Oran International Arabic Film Festival
 Best Short Film, Ismailia International Film Festival
 ACT Award, Ismailia International Film Festival

References

External links

Dry Hot Summers: mec film

2010s Arabic-language films
Films set in Cairo
Films directed by Sherif El Bendary
2015 films
Egyptian drama films